Aris Avato Football Club is a Greek football club based in Avato, Xanthi, Greece.

Honours

Domestic

 Xanthi FCA Champions: 3
 2013–14, 2014–15, 2016–17
 Xanthi FCA Cup Winners: 2
 2016–17, 2017–18

References

External links
 

Football clubs in Eastern Macedonia and Thrace
Xanthi
Association football clubs established in 1958
1958 establishments in Greece
Gamma Ethniki clubs